Venn Spearman Young  (16 February 1929 – 14 January 1993) was a New Zealand politician. He was a member of the National Party, and served as a Cabinet Minister in the government of Robert Muldoon. He is known for his failed attempt to legalise "homosexual acts" in 1975.

Early life
Young was born in Stratford, Taranaki. He attended primary school in Stratford, but received his high school education in Nelson, at Nelson College from 1942 to 1944. He then returned to Taranaki, becoming a dairy farmer. He gained some distinction as a rugby player, representing Taranaki. He was also active in the Anglican Church.

Member of Parliament

In the 1966 election, Young stood as the National Party's candidate for the Egmont electorate, and was successful. He was to hold Egmont in the next three elections, gaining a straight majority each time. At the 1978 election, the Egmont electorate was abolished, and Young successfully contested the new Waitotara electorate. He remained the MP for Waitotara until his departure from politics.

Private members' Bill
In mid 1974, Young attracted considerable controversy by putting forward a private members' bill to legalise private "homosexual acts" between consenting adults. The proposed age of consent was twenty-one, and although this was later reduced to twenty by a select committee, a number of homosexual lobbyists criticised it on this count. By far the most vocal criticism, however, came from conservatives, including many of his National Party colleagues. On 4 July 1975, the bill was defeated, with 34 votes against and 29 votes in favour. There were 24 abstentions.

Cabinet minister

Despite having alienated many of his party colleagues, Young entered Cabinet when National won the 1975 election. Robert Muldoon, the new Prime Minister, appointed Young to the Lands, Forests, and Environment portfolios, which he held for two parliamentary terms from December 1975 to 1981. In 1981, Young was moved to the Social Welfare portfolio, which he retained until National's defeat in the 1984 election.

In the 1990 New Year Honours, Young was appointed a Companion of the Queen's Service Order for public services.

Later life, death, and legacy
Young retired from parliament at the 1990 election, although not before another homosexual law reform bill (promoted by Labour's Fran Wilde), the Homosexual Law Reform Act 1986, was successfully passed which Young voted against.

Young died in January 1993 after suffering a heart attack, and was buried in Hawera Cemetery. He was survived by his wife and nine children, including Jonathan Young who served as the National MP for the New Plymouth electorate from 2008 to 2020.

Notes

References

|-

1929 births
1993 deaths
New Zealand farmers
New Zealand National Party MPs
People educated at Nelson College
People from Stratford, New Zealand
Members of the New Zealand House of Representatives
New Zealand MPs for North Island electorates
Members of the Cabinet of New Zealand
Companions of the Queen's Service Order
Burials at Hawera Cemetery
20th-century New Zealand politicians
New Zealand Anglicans